"Like the Rain" is a song co-written and recorded by American country music artist Clint Black. It was released in September 1996 as the first single from his Greatest Hits compilation album.  The song became his 23rd chart single, and in October of that year, it became his tenth Number One hit on the Billboard Hot Country Singles & Tracks (now Hot Country Songs) charts.  It held that position for three weeks. At the 1997 Grammy Awards, "Like the Rain" was nominated for the Best Male Country Vocal performance.  The song was written by Black and Hayden Nicholas.

Content
"Like the Rain" is a country ballad, backed mainly by acoustic guitar and piano, with heavy snare drum accents. The narrator tells of how he "never liked the rain" until he walked through it with his lover. In the chorus, he adds that he "can't believe [he] never liked the rain", and then elaborates that he is "falling for [her] now, just like the rain". The album version features the sounds of rain and thunder at the beginning and end. These sound effects were lacked from the single edit.

Black also re-recorded the song, at a slightly slower tempo, for his 2007 compilation The Love Songs.

Critical reception
Deborah Evans Price, of Billboard magazine reviewed the song favorably by saying that the song is a "moody offering with a driving melody and strong lyric." She goes on to say that Black "turns in his reliably potent vocal performance."

Chart positions
"Like the Rain" debuted at number 42 on the U.S. Billboard Hot Country Singles & Tracks for the week of September 7, 1996.

Year-end charts

Certifications

References

1996 singles
Clint Black songs
Songs written by Clint Black
Songs written by Hayden Nicholas
Song recordings produced by Clint Black
Song recordings produced by James Stroud
RCA Records Nashville singles
1996 songs
Songs about weather